Velikovo may refer to the following places in Bulgaria:

Velikovo, Dobrich Province
Velikovo, Stara Zagora Province